Miriam Marecek (1940-2020) was an educational consultant and author specializing in the field of children's literature.

She taught in the literacy field, as a professor at Harvard Graduate School of Education, Boston University, Wheelock College, Tufts University, and Bank Street College.

Marecek was the past President of the Children's Literature and Reading section of the International Reading Association. She served as an Advisor to Boston City Hospital's Reach Out and Read program and The Electric Company (Children's Television Workshop). Her educational consultant credits include the award-winning family literacy program "Words That Cook", and the Emmy Award-winning children's TV series, A Likely Story. In 2014, she wrote her memoir, "Escape from Prague: Composing a New Life In America."

Marecek was born in Prague, Czechoslovakia. She lived in Winchester, Massachusetts and has three children.

References

Professional Website 

2020 deaths
Harvard Graduate School of Education faculty
Boston University faculty
Tufts University faculty
Writers from Prague
People from Winchester, Massachusetts
1940 births